Marow may refer to:
Marow Baronets
Maru, Iran (disambiguation)